Santiago Martín may refer to:

People
James Martin Eder (1838–1921), also known as Santiago Martín Eder Kaiser, Colombian industrialist
Santiago Martín Prado (born 1955), retired Spanish footballer
Santiago Martín Rivas, Chilean military officer and member of Grupo Colina
Santiago Martín Hondo Ndongo (born 1974), Equatoguinean footballer
Santiago Martín Silva Olivera (born 1980), Uruguayan footballer
 Santiago Martín Maidana (born 1991), Spanish footballer
Santiago Martín Pérez (born 1998), Uruguayan footballer
Santiago Martín Paiva Mattos (born 1999), Uruguayan footballer
 (born 1938), nickname of Santiago Martín Sánchez, Spanish bullfighter

Venues
 Pabellón Insular Santiago Martín, indoor arena in San Cristóbal de La Laguna, Spain

See also
Marty (rapper) (born 1987), American rapper, birth name Martin Lorenzo Santiago

Martín, Santiago